USS Annapolis (AGMR-1) was the former  (ex-Sunset Bay) and a  of the United States Navy.

Reclassified as AGMR-1 on 1 June 1963, renamed USS Annapolis on 22 June 1963, and then commissioned on 7 March 1964 with Captain John J. Rowan becoming its first commanding officer.  Captain Rowan also served as the pre-commissioning officer when the ship was removed from the Naval Fleet Reserve in Bayonne, New Jersey and then converted at the New York Navy Shipyard.

Service history

Conversion
Her new hull classification as AGMR (Auxiliary General Major Relay) reflected her ability to serve as a floating communications station on the move.  This capability allowed Annapolis to position herself at any ocean global position to provide major communication services without the construction and expense of a ground-based, communications facilities.

The conversion from CVE to AGMR involved the modification of the flight deck to include a hurricane bow, removal of Second World War armament and the addition of four radar controlled twin 3-inch 50 caliber anti-aircraft gun mounts, two per side.

The flight deck was converted to an antenna array with two directional and two omnidirectional antennas. The aircraft hangar bay was converted into communication spaces although one aircraft elevator was retained to allow servicing of equipment and boat storage.  In the communication spaces were installed 24 radio transmitters with low through ultra-high frequencies. To provide the necessary cooling of equipment in the communications spaces, three 120-ton air conditioning units were installed with 130 tons dedicated for the communications spaces.  The remaining air conditioning tonnage was routed to the other interior spaces of the ship.

All the WWII boilers and steam turbines were retained. However, the original boiler and engine room designs were modified in 1966. The original design prevented both screws from being used if one of the boilers needed maintenance while underway. This was due to the WWII design calling for the ship to have two separate and distinct engineering plants; one for each screw.  Because of this, when one boiler was taken down while underway, the ship had to go to single-screw operation. Due to an event in 1966 on the DMZ, the ship's chief engineer, the boiler technicians (BT), and machinist mates (MM) redesigned the steam lines to allow for a steam cross-connect whereby the ship could operate both shafts from a single fire-room when boiler maintenance was needed while underway. After approval by the Bureau of Ships, the necessary modifications were installed at United States Fleet Activities Sasebo during the ship's maintenance period in the latter part of 1966.

The WWII equipped bridge was retained although new gyrocompass' and modern surface radar were installed.  Also retained were her huge fuel storage capacity which gave her the ability to sail around the world without refueling. The WWII galley retained both cooking capabilities but only one food serving line was used during Annapolis'  service life.

All of the WWII era crew's berthing spaces remained, including the [rope laced canvas] on a pipe frame sleeping racks with each topped with a  foam rubber mattress supported by chains attached to the overhead (ceiling).  Most racks were three-high in sleeping compartments but there were a few two-high depending on space availability.  Most berthing compartments contained 20-50 racks while at least one berthing compartment contained well over 100 racks.

Annapoliss original plans called for her to be the first sea vessel to have satellite communications that would provide direct communications to military commanders in the Pacific and Washington DC, but she sailed from Norfolk, VA without that capability. The new satellite technology was delivered to Annapolis in late 1966 while she was at anchor at U.S. Naval Base Subic Bay, Philippines.  Installation begin while in port, but the final installation and operational tests occurred at sea.  This included the installation of the satellite dish antenna off the coast of Vietnam and was performed by the ship-fitters in the Engineering Department.

Commissioning
Annapolis was commissioned at the Brooklyn Navy Yard on 7 March 1964 with commissioning ceremonies officiated by Capt John Rowan.  Local dignitaries and officials of the Navy also attended.  The New York Times reported that she "would not 'stay put' but would follow the fleet in world-wide operations."  Immediately after commissioning Annapolis moved to Naval Station Norfolk to undergo a shakedown and operational training period.  In June 1965, Annapolis departed Norfolk for duty in Vietnam by way of Europe and the Suez Canal. Annapolis was assigned Long Beach, California as home port on 28 June 1965.

Deployment
Annapolis spent her entire 5-year active service at and around the DMZ of Vietnam.  She did visit United States Fleet Activities Yokosuka in Japan for drydock and maintenance, United States Fleet Activities Sasebo in Japan, Hong Kong, Kaohsiung, Taiwan, Singapore, Perth, Australia, Keelung, Taiwan, and White Beach, Okinawa (Uruma, Okinawa) but the majority of port calls being U.S. Naval Base Subic Bay, Philippines.  Since the ship was assigned non-rotational deployment, that is, permanently assigned to support operations in Vietnam, the individual crew members were assigned and transferred on a 12-14-month deployment although it is known that some received assignments much longer.  It is also known that some of the crew members requested back-to-back tours on Annapolis.

Vietnam
Arriving off the coast of Vietnam, Annapolis immediately begin providing communication services between naval units and shore communication facilities. As other ships and shore installations learned of her capability, they begin to rely on her more than was anticipated.

In late 1966, the first ship-to-shore satellite radio message ever transmitted and received was between Annapolis in South China Sea and Pacific Fleet Headquarters at Pearl Harbor. With the exception of periodic visits in the Western Pacific, mainly Subic Bay, she continued this important service into November 1969. Annapolis assured a smooth and steady flow of information and relaying operational orders.  Until her sister ship, joined her in Vietnam in the latter part of 1967, Annapolis averaged 55 days at sea between port calls due to the high communication demands required during the Vietnam War.

Annapolis while on station off the coast of Vietnam did drop anchor every 10–15 days for a few hours outside Cam Ranh Bay to receive mail and transfer priority crew.  During those brief stops, Navy swift boats would come alongside to receive much appreciated ice cream in 3-gallon containers that were prepared by the ships cooks the night before.

In addition to providing communications support, Annapolis provided rescue at sea operations.  Once after a Hong Kong flagged merchant ship sank and rescuing one seaman, then searching for a downed pilot above the DMZ.  Annapolis also provided assistance during the  fire by providing fire fighting foam via Forrestals helicopters.

On 23 January 1968 after crossing the equator south of Singapore while sailing for a port call to Perth, Australia, Annapolis received emergency orders to return to Vietnam at the best speed possible.   had been boarded by the North Korean navy, and Annapolis was to return to Vietnam to relieve Arlington, so that Arlington could make a flank speed sail to Korea to assist in that incident. It was probably the fastest speed Annapolis ever made with rumors of her making almost . Those on board at the time remember the stern of the ship vibrating feverishly while the engineering crew made maximum effort to keep the flank speed for the return trip, reducing the return by almost 24 hours.

Decommissioning
Annapolis was decommissioned 20 December 1969 at Naval Station Norfolk, transferred to the Atlantic Reserve Fleet and immediately towed to the Philadelphia Naval Shipyard where she was placed in mothballs. The ship was stricken from the Naval Vessel Register 15 October 1976 and sold for scrap on 1 November 1979.  She never saw her home port of Long Beach, CA.

Prototype Communications
Annapolis was not the first ship to have satellite transmission capability. Annapolis was the first Navy fleet operational ship with that capability.

In many ways, the new satellite capability on the Annapolis paved the way for future communications in the Navy and later for worldwide communications.  During this infancy, satellites were low orbiting meaning that satellites were available only for short durations; often measured in 5-15 minute intervals.  Geostationary satellites were not available for military use until some years later. Although the satellite tracking capability was a success, it did have its problems in these early periods.  The use of unproven gyroscopes to keep the satellite dish stable due to the ship's rolling and pitching in stormy and salty conditions while tracking the low orbiting satellites was a challenge for the electronics crew, often spending many hours tweaking and adjusting the equipment.  During UNREP (Underway replenishment) operations with another ship, the satellite equipment was secured due to safety concerns because of its high power emissions.

Often overlooked, Annapolis relayed Sitreps (situation reports) of the North Vietnamese military operations directly to the commanders in Washington DC via satellite with some political interest situations reported to the White House.  The Tet Offensive and Battle of Khe Sanh are just two of those battles that Sitreps were relayed by Annapolis.  With this new capability the Sitreps and progreps (progress reports) were reported often in minutes whereas regular communications of the times were often measured in hours at best.

Annapolis can be considered a prototype ship or even an experiment for future naval communications, and proving her capability during the Vietnam War. When those two ships were commissioned, much of the same technologies that Annapolis carried were installed, which is a tribute to the Navy planners and engineers of Annapolis.

Incidents at Sea
Like any other ship, Annapolis had her own incidents at sea during her short career. Below is a short list of some of those incidents and is not all inclusive:

1. In October 1965, Ensign Leonard Anderson was reported missing when he failed to report for a mid-watch on the bridge while the ship was underway off the coast of Vietnam. He was declared lost at sea after three days of searching by Annapolis and a number of other Navy ships in the area.

2. During VERTREP (vertical replenishment via helicopter) operations off the coast of Vietnam in 1966, a rotor blade of a helicopter struck Annapoliss first omnidirectional antenna on the flight deck and crashed resulting in the loss of the pilot.

3. In 1966 while making almost flank speed in the South China Sea, Annapolis rammed several large teak logs causing damage to shaft bearings and both of her screws (propellers).  This required a diversion from operations off the coast of Vietnam and she limped at 4-5 knots to United States Fleet Activities Yokosuka, Japan for dry dock repairs.  Both screw were so severely damaged that replacement screws were removed from a mothballed ship in the States then shipped to Yokosuka and installed.

4. In the summer of 1966, Annapolis entered port with one of its three air conditioning units inoperative.  A second unit failed while in port.  A copper nickel line set was flown in with a manufacturer technical representative from the States and he provided technical direction on the repairs.  As soon as the first unit was repaired, the third unit failed.  Annapolis ended up having an extended stay in Subic due to the multiple problems with the air conditioning units.  During this time the crew carried their mattresses each night and slept topside while in port due to intolerable conditions within the interior spaces of the ship.

5. In 1966 during a boiler maintenance period and underway on one screw while sailing near the DMZ, four unidentified contacts appeared on radar and were closing on the ship at high speed.  The ship went to general quarters (battle stations).  It turned out to be four Nasty-class patrol boats returning from a raid above the DMZ.  From that point on, the ship never went to a boiler maintenance period on a single screw operation again while off the coast of Vietnam.

6. In 1967, the air conditioning system (second occurrence) for the forward third of the ship had a major catastrophic failure.  The Repair Division did all they could to reroute air flow from other parts of the ship but cooling the forward third of the ship was out of the question.  Although it was very uncomfortable working within the spaces during the day, it was impossible to sleep in the berthing compartments due to the ensuing heat and humidity.  Many of the crew during this period carried their mattresses each night to the fo'c'sle (forecastle) and topside to the flight deck, and slept there for about 15 nights until replacement components were VERTREP’ed and installed.

7. Also in 1967, while steaming slow speed off the coast of Vietnam on a moonless night in choppy seas after mid-night, a large Vietnamese fishing boat collided with Annapolis.  The impact was near the bow on the starboard side of the ship and the fishing boat then bounced and ricocheted along the entire length of the starboard side of the ship sounding like a bucket of large stones in a concrete mixer.  In an effort to evade the oncoming boat, the officer of the deck gave the order to come "hard to port" when the turn should have been "hard to starboard" to allow the ship's stern to swing to port and away from the fishing boat.  Instead the stern swung to starboard further complicating the collision causing all the commotion and noise that was heard throughout the ship.  The fishing boat had been underway without navigational lights and only showed up on the ship's radar at the last moment. Since it was in restricted waters near the DMZ and acted suspiciously even after the collision, Annapolis reported its position and continued on her patrol leaving the disabled suspicious fishing boat adrift.

8. Annapolis also in 1967 had a diesel fuel line rupture in the engineering spaces resulting in diesel fuel being sprayed on an exhaust manifold.  This caused large amount of dense smoke but no fire.  However, several of the engineering crew were quickly overcome with smoke and were rescued by a damage control party.

9. In late 1967, Annapolis was almost rammed by the destroyer . The destroyer was making an approach on Annapolis starboard side to conduct an UNREP maneuver.  Its approach was too fast and too close to the aft-starboard gun mount and came within a few feet of colliding with Annapolis.

Awards

USS Gilbert Islands (CVE-107) 

 American Campaign Medal
 Asiatic-Pacific Campaign Medal with three battle stars
 World War II Victory Medal
 Navy Occupation Service Medal with "Asia" and "Europe" clasps
 National Defense Service Medal
 Korean Service Medal

USS Annapolis (AGMR-1) 

 Navy Meritorious Unit Commendation
 National Defense Service Medal (2nd award)
 Vietnam Service Medal with eight campaign stars
 Republic of Vietnam Meritorious Unit Citation (Gallantry Cross Medal with Palm)
 Republic of Vietnam Campaign Medal

Notes

References
Notes

Sources
 (Annapolis)
 (Gilbert Islands)

External links
 USS Annapolis Association
 
 Ships of the U.S. Navy, 1940-1945: CVE-107 USS Gilbert Islands
 Plane Fun

Commencement Bay-class escort carriers
World War II escort aircraft carriers of the United States
Cold War aircraft carriers of the United States
Ships built in Los Angeles
1944 ships

ja:ギルバート・アイランズ (護衛空母)